Beven is a surname. Notable people with the surname include:

Brad Beven (born 1969), Australian triathlete
Ian Beven (born 1958), Australian-Scottish cricketer
Keith Beven (born 1950), British hydrologist
Lorenz Beven (1872–1947), Sri Lankan Anglican priest